Bob Ogden is a former professional rugby league footballer who played in the 1940s and 1950s.

Playing career
Ogden made his début for Wakefield Trinity during January 1949.

References

External links

Search for "Ogden" at rugbyleagueproject.org

Living people
English rugby league players
Oldham R.L.F.C. players
Year of birth missing (living people)
Place of birth missing (living people)
Rugby league halfbacks
Wakefield Trinity players